Indonesia participated at the 2023 Southeast Asian Games in Phnom Penh, Cambodia from 5 to 17 May 2022.

Athletics 

The Indonesian Athletics Team dispatched 28 athletes consisting of 18 male athletes and 10 female athletes to compete in the 2023 Southeast Asian Games

Men

Women

Billiards 

The Indonesian Billiards and Snooker Team dispatched 12 athletes, all male, to compete in the 2023 Southeast Asian Games

Pool
Feri Satriadi
Ismail Kadir 
Punguan Sihombing
Billy Robiansyah

Snooker
Dhendy Kristalianto
Gebby Adi Wibawa
Chandra Wijaya
Ignatius Sigit

Carom
Herwanto
Johnny Chandra

English billiard
Marlando Sihombing
Jaka Kurniawan

Weightlifting

The Indonesian Weightlifting Team sent 12 athletes to compete in the 2023 Southeast Asian Games consisting of 6 male athletes and 6 female athletes
 
Men

 
Women

Wushu

The Indonesian Wushu Team sent 14 athletes to compete in the 2023 Southeast Asian Games consisting of 9 male athletes and 5 female athletes

Men
Taolu
Edgar Xavier Marvelo
Harris Horatius
Seraf Naro Siregar
Nicholas
Daffa Golden Boy

Sanda
Laksamana Pandu Pratama
Bintang Reindra Nada Guitara
Samuel Marbun
Bayu Raka Putra

Women
Taolu
Nandhira Mauriskha
Eugenia Diva Widodo
Tasya Ayu Puspa Dewi

Sanda
Rosa Beatrice Malau
Tharisa Dea Florentina

References

2023 in Indonesian sport
2023